Tesuquea is a genus of moths in the Carposinidae family. It contains the single species Tesuquea hawleyana, which is found in the southern United States, including New Mexico.

The wingspan is about 14 mm.

References

Natural History Museum Lepidoptera generic names catalog

Carposinidae